Géza Röhrig (May 11, 1967) is a Hungarian actor and poet. He is best known for his role in the 2015 film Son of Saul, which won the Grand Prix at the 2015 Cannes Film Festival, the Golden Globe for Best Foreign Language Film and the Academy Award for Best Foreign Language Film.

Life and career
Géza Röhrig was born in Budapest, Hungary. His mother left the family after he was born, and his father died when he was four, so Röhrig spent his childhood in foster care. From the age of 12 he was raised by a Jewish family. In the 1980s, he was the frontman of an underground music band called Huckleberry (also known as HuckRebelly), whose concerts were almost always interrupted by the communist authorities. At university he studied Hungarian and Polish, and after a visit to Auschwitz during a study tour in Poland, he decided to become an Orthodox Jew in Brooklyn, United States. He portrayed poet Attila József in a film by József Madaras. He studied filmmaking under István Szabó.

He graduated from the Academy of Drama and Film in Budapest with a degree in filmmaking. Since 2000, he has lived in the Bronx borough of New York City, where he received a degree from the Jewish Theological Seminary and has been a kindergarten teacher at Hannah Senesh Community Day School in Brooklyn. He is married, and has four children. He has published many collections of poetry.

Work

Prose

Poetry

Filmography

Film
2015: Son of Saul by László Nemes: Saul
2018: To Dust by Shawn Snyder: Shmuel
2018: The Chaperone: Joseph
 2019: Muse by Candida Brady: Luca
 2019: Bad Art by Tania Raymonde: Gene
 2020: Resistance by Jonathan Jakubowicz: Georges Loinger
 2020: Undergods by Chino Moya: Z
TBA: The Way of the Wind by Terrence Malick: Jesus Christ

Television
1989: Közjáték, episode Mrożek: Levélkék (director)
1989: Eszmélet by József Madaras, episodes 1 and 2: Attila József
1990: Armelle by Jacek Lenczowski: Piotr

References

1967 births
Living people
Jewish Hungarian actors
21st-century Hungarian male actors
Hungarian male film actors
Hungarian male television actors
20th-century Hungarian male actors
Hungarian expatriates in the United States
Hungarian male poets
20th-century Hungarian poets
21st-century Hungarian poets